Royce Metchie (born September 11, 1996) is a professional Canadian football defensive back for the Toronto Argonauts of the Canadian Football League (CFL).

University career
Metchie played U Sports football for the Guelph Gryphons from 2014 to 2017.

Professional career

Calgary Stampeders
Metchie was drafted by the Stampeders in the third round, 25th overall, in the 2018 CFL Draft and signed with the team on May 14, 2018. He began the 2018 season on the practice roster, but was soon elevated to the active roster and played in his first game on June 28, 2018 against the Ottawa Redblacks. He dressed in seven regular season games in his rookie season and recorded five special teams tackles. He was on the practice roster during the playoffs when he shared in the Stampeders' 106th Grey Cup victory.

Following the off-season departure of starting safety Tunde Adeleke and the retirement of Adam Berger, Metchie became the Stampeders' starting safety for the 2019 season. He recorded his first career CFL interception during the Labour Day Classic on September 2, 2019 against the Edmonton Eskimos. He played and started in 17 regular season games for the team in 2019 where he had 48 defensive tackles, seven special teams tackles, and three interceptions. He signed a contract extension with the Stampeders on January 18, 2021. He played in seven games in 2021 where he had 31 defensive tackles, one interception, and one forced fumble.

Toronto Argonauts
On February 4, 2022, Metchie was traded to the Toronto Argonauts in exchange for Cameron Judge as both players had contracts expiring the following week. He played in 17 regular season games where he had 72 defensive tackles and two interceptions. He also played in both post-season games, including the 109th Grey Cup, where he recorded three defensive tackles as he won his second Grey Cup championship in the victory over the Winnipeg Blue Bombers. On February 3, 2023, it was announced that Metchie had signed a two-year contract extension with the Argonauts.

Personal life
Metchie was born in Nigeria to a Nigerian father and Taiwanese mother, and spent some time in his youth in Ghana and Taiwan before spending his childhood in Brampton, Ontario, Canada. Metchie's younger brother, John Metchie III, is a wide receiver who played college football for  Alabama and was drafted in the 2022 NFL Draft by the Houston Texans.

References

External links
Toronto Argonauts bio

1996 births
Living people
Calgary Stampeders players
Canadian football defensive backs
Canadian people of Nigerian descent
Canadian people of Taiwanese descent
Guelph Gryphons football players
Nigerian players of Canadian football
Nigerian emigrants to Canada
People from Brampton
Players of Canadian football from Ontario
Toronto Argonauts players